Elaine Chen is an academic and an engineering executive in the haptic technology field.
She is named as the lead inventor on the Microsoft patent for force feedback joystick.

Biography 

Chen earned bachelor's and master's degrees in engineering at the Massachusetts Institute of Technology. She served as VP of Product Engineering at Rethink Robotics. Later, she became affiliated with the Martin Trust Center for MIT Entrepreneurship prior to joining the Tufts Gordon Institute as Cummings Family Professor of the Practice in Entrepreneurship in 2020.

Published works

Books

Articles
 E. Chen and B. Marcus, "Force feedback for surgical simulation," in Proceedings of the IEEE, vol. 86, no. 3, pp. 524-530, March 1998, doi: 10.1109/5.662877.
 Cohen, A, & Chen, E. "Six Degree-of-Freedom Haptic System as a Desktop Virtual Prototyping Interface." Proceedings of the ASME 1999 International Mechanical Engineering Congress and Exposition. Dynamic Systems and Control. Nashville, Tennessee, USA. November 14–19, 1999. pp. 401-402. ASME. https://doi.org/10.1115/IMECE1999-0053

References

External links
 Patents

American women engineers
Living people
Massachusetts Institute of Technology alumni
Year of birth missing (living people)
Tufts University faculty